The Pachuca metropolitan area is a metropolitan area located in the state of Hidalgo in Mexico. It consists of the municipalities of Pachuca, Mineral del Monte, Mineral de la Reforma, San Agustín Tlaxiaca, Epazoyucan, Zapotlán de Juárez and Zempoala.

References

Metropolitan areas of Mexico
Geography of Hidalgo (state)